Derek Wayne Youngsma is the drummer for the Orange County, California metalcore band Bleeding Through. Formerly of Cast in Stone, Youngsma joined the band prior the band's second release 2002's Portrait of the Goddess.  He replaced Troy Born after he left in 2002.

Personal life
He is Christian, straight edge and married to his wife, Jessica. They have two children together, a daughter Zoe (born 2008) and a son Ezra (born 2010).

Discography
Bleeding Through
Studio albums

DVDs
 This Is Live, This Is Murderous (15 June 2004, Kung Fu Records)
 Wolves Among Sheep (15 November 2005, Trustkill Records)

Cast in Stone
EPs
 Life on Trial (2000, Guitar)

Splits
 Now the Tables Have Turned (2000, Drums; Split w/ Torn in Two and Point of Recognition)Guest appearances' There Is No Turning Back'' by Welcome to Your Life (2002)

References

1980 births
21st-century American drummers
American drummers
Bleeding Through members
Living people